Ladda eburones is a species of butterfly in the family Hesperiidae. It is found in Ecuador, Colombia, Peru and Bolivia.

Subspecies
Ladda eburones eburones (Bolivia)
Ladda eburones ena Evans, 1955 (Peru)
Ladda eburones inornata (Bell, 1937) (Ecuador, Colombia)

References

Butterflies described in 1877
Hesperiidae of South America
Taxa named by William Chapman Hewitson